Joe Hin Tjio (2 November 1919 – 27 November 2001), was an Indonesian-born American cytogeneticist. He was renowned as the first person to recognize the normal number of human chromosomes on December 22, 1955 at the Institute of Genetics of the University of Lund in Sweden, where Tjio was a visiting scientist.

Early life
Tjio (whose name is pronounced CHEE-oh) was born to Indonesian parents of Chinese origin in Pekalongan, Java, then part of the Dutch East Indies and later known as Indonesia. His father was a photographer. Tjio was educated in Dutch colonial schools, trained in agronomy in college, and did research on potato breeding. He was imprisoned for 3 years and tortured by the Japanese in a concentration camp during World War II.

Career
After the war ended, Tjio went to the Netherlands, whose government provided him with a fellowship for study in Europe. He worked in plant breeding in Denmark, Spain and Sweden. From 1948 to 1959 he did plant chromosome research in Zaragoza in Spain and spent his summers in Sweden working with Professor Albert Levan in Lund.
 
In 1955, Tjio made his discovery of the correct human chromosome count (46 chromosomes, rather than 48 as counted in 1921 by Theophilus Painter) and the findings were published (with Levan as his co-author) in the Scandinavian journal Hereditas on January 26, 1956.

In 1958 Tjio went to the United States and in 1959 he joined the staff of the National Institutes of Health in Bethesda, Maryland. He received his Ph.D. in biophysics and cytogenetics from the University of Colorado. He spent the balance of his career at the NIH in human chromosome research. He was named scientist emeritus in 1992, but maintained a laboratory for the next five years. In 1997, he retired to Gaithersburg, Maryland.

Works
Tjio JH, Levan A. The chromosome number of man. Hereditas vol. 42: pages 1–6, 1956.

References

External links
Human chromosome count in MedTerms Medical Dictionary

1919 births
2001 deaths
American geneticists
American people of Chinese-Indonesian descent
Indonesian emigrants to the United States
Indonesian people of Chinese descent
People from Pekalongan
American people of Chinese descent
Hakka scientists